Crystals is an album by Sam Rivers released by Impulse! Records in 1974 in a stereo/quadraphonic format.

Criticism 
Jazz critic Thom Jurek wrote: “Musically, this is the mature Sam Rivers speaking from the wide base of his knowledge as a composer, improviser and conceptualist.”

Background 
It had been over a decade since Ornette Coleman had worked with his Free Jazz Double Quartet, nine years since John Coltrane assembled his Ascension band, and six since the first Jazz Composers' Orchestra Association was formed and whose first records were issued (a couple of members of that band also performing with Rivers on this record) and the compositions for what eventually became Crystals were written between 1959 and 1972. They were finished as new elements came to him to fit them together conceptually.

The album was released by Impulse! in September 1974, and was out of print after a few years.  It was re-released in CD form in 2002 (with Rivers' original liner notes), and available for three years through Universal Distribution.

The compositions were recorded over a period of five or six hours by an ensemble sometimes reported as 14 musicians: 3 trumpets, 2 trombones, tuba, 5 reeds, bass, and 2 drummers. Other musicians listed in the vinyl liner notes were present in rehearsals (and their contributions incorporated in the final results) but not the recording.

Track listing 
 "Exultation" – 8:25
 "Tranquility" – 8:58
 "Postlude" – 2:31
 "Bursts" – 6:51
 "Orb" – 9:36
 "Earth Song" – 4:09

Personnel 
Including Rivers, this big band numbers 'sixty-four' musicians, including:
 Sam Rivers – saxophones, conductor
 Sinclair Acey – trumpet
 Ted Daniel – trumpet
 Richard Williams – trumpet
 Charles Greenlee – trombone
 Charles Stephens – trombone
 Joe Daley – trombone, tuba
 Roland Alexander – soprano and tenor saxophone, flute
 Fred Kelly – soprano and baritone saxophone, flute
 Joe Ferguson – alto, tenor & soprano saxophones, flute
 Paul Jeffrey – tenor saxophone, flute, clarinet, oboe, bassett horn, bassoon
 Gregory Maker – acoustic & electric bass violin
 Ronnie Boykins – bass guitar
 Harold Smith – drums, percussion
 Warren Smith – drums, percussion

Credits from AllMusic include 62 musicians (not including Maker):

Flugelhorn, trumpet
 Ahmed Abdullah
 Sinclair Acey
 Martin Banks
 Jothan Callins
 Teddy Daniel
 Joe Dupars
 Ronald Hampton
 Virgil Jones
 Don McIntosh
 Marvin "Hannibal" Peterson
 Michael Ridley
 Norman Spiller
 Charles Sullivan
 Clifford Thornton
 Richard Williams 
 Yusef Yancey

Trombone
 Bill Campbell
 Ashley Fennell
 Charles Greenlee
 Vincent Holmes
 Grachan Moncur III
 Charles Stephens

Tuba
 Bob Stewart
 Howard Johnson
 Joe Daley

Horn
 Julius Watkins
 Richard Dunbar

Flute, saxophone
 Roland Alexander – flute, soprano and tenor saxophones
 Paul Jeffrey – flute, tenor saxophone
 Fred Kelly – flute, soprano, alto, and baritone saxophones
 Sam Rivers – flute, soprano and tenor saxophones

Woodwinds
 Bill Barron
 Hamiet Bluiett
 Anthony Braxton
 Ron Bridgewater
 Bobby Capers
 Robin Kenyatta
 Pat Patrick
 Bob Ralston
 Bill Saxton
 John Stubblefield
 James Ware
 Monty Waters
 Dave Young

Bass violin
 Ronnie Boykins
 Bob Cunningham
 Richard Davis
 Stafford James
 Hakim Jami
 Reggie Workman

Percussion
 Horace Arnold
 Art Blakey
 Roger Blank
 Sonny Brown
 Norman Connors
 Andrew Cyrille
 Steve Ellington
 Billy Hart
 Maurice McKinley
 Harold Smith
 Warren Smith – drums
 Steve Solder

Production
 Ken Druker – executive producer
 Bryan Koniarz – producer
 Ed Michel – producer
 Kevin Reeves – mastering

References 

Sam Rivers (jazz musician) albums
1974 albums
Impulse! Records albums